The year 1673 in music involved some significant events.

Events
John Blow becomes organist of Westminster Abbey.
Agostino Steffani begins his studies in Rome under Ercole Bernabei.
Johann Michael Bach becomes organist and town clerk of Gehren.
Robert Cambert arrives in Britain.
Giovanni Maria Bononcini publishes his treatise, .
Henry Purcell is apprenticed to the organist John Hingeston.

Publications
Giovanni Maria Bononcini – Musico prattico, Op.8
Erasmus Gruber – Synopsis musica
Matthew Locke – The Present Practice of Musick

Classical music
Giovanni-Battista Agneletti – Gloria patri et filio et spiritui sancto
Heinrich Biber – Battalia à 10
Cristofaro Caresana – La Tarentella
 Marc-Antoine Charpentier 
 Ouverture et intermèdes, H.494
 Symphonie devant Regina, H.509
 Prélude, H.510
 Prélude, H.512
Agostino Guerrieri – 13 Sonatas, Op. 1
Sebastien Knüpfer – Erforsche mich, Gott (May 14)
Giovanni Legrenzi
Violin Duo and continuo
La Cetra (Op. 10), a collection of sonatas
 Matthew Locke – Melothesia
 Jean-Baptiste Lully – La pastorale comique, LWV 33

Opera
Wolfgang Carl Briegel – 
Jean-Baptiste Lully
Cadmus et Hermione
Alceste
Antonio Sartorio – Orfeo
Pietro Andrea Ziani – Marcello in Siracuse
Matthew Locke – Psyche

Births
January 30 – Marc-Antoine Legrand, lyricist (died 1728)
February 1 – Alessandro Marcello, composer (d. 1747)
April 16 – Francesco Feroci, composer (d. 1750)
June 18 – Antonio de Literes, composer of zarzuelas (died 1747)
July 25 – Santiago de Murcia, guitarist and composer (died 1739)
August 28 – Conrad Michael Schneider, composer (died 1752)
September 29 – Jacques Hotteterre, composer (d. 1763)
October 26 – Dimitrie Cantemir, composer, musicologist and polymath (d. 1723)
date unknown – Johannes Kelpius, the first Pennsylvanian composer (died 1708)

Deaths
February 2 – Kaspar Förster, composer and musician (born by 1616)
February 17 – Molière, opera librettist (born 1622)
date unknown – Lemme Rossi, music theorist

References 

 
17th century in music
Music by year